Phialophora asteris is an ascomycete fungus that is a plant pathogen infecting sunflowers.

References

Further reading

Eurotiomycetes
Fungal plant pathogens and diseases
Sunflower diseases
Fungi described in 1923